= Little Donna's =

Restaurant in Baltimore, Maryland, U.S.

- Interactive map of Little Donna's

Restaurant information
- Location: 1812 Bank Street, Baltimore, Maryland, 21231, United States
- Coordinates: 39°17′12.7″N 76°35′27.1″W

Little Donna's is a restaurant in Baltimore, Maryland. Established in June 2022, the business was included in The New York Times's 2023 list of the nation's 50 best restaurants and 2024 list of 22 best pizzerias in the U.S.
